Charlotte, the largest city in the U.S. state of North Carolina, is the site of 60 completed high-rises over , 8 of which stand taller than . The tallest building in the city is the Bank of America Corporate Center, which rises  in Uptown Charlotte and was completed in 1992. It also stands as the tallest building in North Carolina and the 56th-tallest building in the United States. The second-tallest skyscraper in the city is the 550 South Tryon formerly Duke Energy Center, which rises  and was completed in 2010. The Truist Center, completed in 2002 and rising , is the third-tallest building in Charlotte. Nine of the ten tallest buildings in North Carolina are located in Charlotte.

The history of skyscrapers in the city began with the construction of the Independence Building in 1909. This building, rising  and 14 floors, is often regarded as the first skyscraper in Charlotte; despite having been added to the Registered Historic Place in 1978, it was demolished in 1981 to allow for the construction of One Independence Center. There are  eight buildings under construction that are planned to rise at least  or at least 15 floors.



Tallest buildings

This height includes spires and architectural details but does not include antenna masts.

Tallest under construction

, there are 7 buildings under construction in Charlotte that are planned to rise at least .

Tallest approved pending construction

These buildings have either been approved, issued permits, or awaiting construction

Timeline of tallest buildings

Since 1909, the year the first high-rise in the city was constructed, the title of the tallest building in Charlotte has been held by eight high-rises.

See also
 Uptown Charlotte
 List of tallest buildings in North Carolina / the United States / the world
 List of tallest buildings in Raleigh, North Carolina

Notes

References
 General

 Specific

External links
 Charlotte Skyscraper Diagram on SkyscraperPage

Charlotte
 
Tallest in Charlotte